Ondipudur is a major residential neighbourhood of the city of Coimbatore in Tamil Nadu, India. It is situated in the south-eastern part of the city.
It is one of the well developed neighborhoods in the city and has been part of Coimbatore Corporation since 1981.

Gallery

Geography
The nerve centre of Ondipudur is Trichy Road. This road passes through the nerve centre  of Ondipudur. Other major roads include Irugur Road and Peedampalli Road. It is located about 7 km from the Coimbatore International Airport and about 11 km from City railway station,12 km from Gandhipuram Central Bus Terminus and 13 km from Podanur railway station and is well connected to local bus services to various parts of the city. Ondipudur shares its border with Singanallur, Vellalore, Irugur, Pallapalayam and SIHS Colony.

Transport 
Onidpudur lies along National Highway 81 (India) the Trichy Road one of the important arterial roads in the Coimbatore City.

Ondipudur Flyover 
The Ondipudur Flyover was constructed in 2006 as a four-lane flyover to ease traffic congestion in Trichy road caused by a railway line connecting Podanur Junction and Irugur bypassing the Coimbatore Junction.

Coimbatore metro 
Ondipudur is a part of the proposed Coimbatore metro metro corridor connecting Karanampettai and Thaneerpanthal.

Theatres
Miraj Cinemas, Coimbatore

Politics 
The locality of Ondipudur is a part of Singanallur (state assembly constituency) and Coimbatore (Lok Sabha constituency).

References 

Neighbourhoods in Coimbatore